Robert Hopkins Hatton (November 2, 1826 – May 31, 1862) was a lawyer and politician from Tennessee. He was a state legislator and US Representative, and a Confederate general during the American Civil War.

Biography
Hatton was born in either Steubenville or Youngstown, Ohio (sources differ). His father, Rev. Robert Clopton Hatton, was a Methodist preacher. Early in his life, in 1842, his family moved to Tennessee. He graduated from Cumberland University, then studied law there at Cumberland School of Law. He established a successful practice in Lebanon, Tennessee, after passing the bar exam in 1850 He joined the Whig Party and was elected to the State Legislature in 1855. He unsuccessfully ran for governor in 1857. In 1858, he was elected US Representative from the 5th District as an Opposition Party candidate (the Whig party had collapsed). In the Thirty-sixth Congress, he served as chairman of the Committee on Expenditures in the Department of the Navy.

Hatton believed that the Union should be preserved and initially opposed secession. However, after President Lincoln called for volunteers to put down rebellion, Hatton became a secessionist. He formed a Confederate military unit, the Lebanon Blues, which became a part of the 7th Tennessee Infantry. Hatton was soon elected as colonel of the regiment, which was sent to western Virginia in July 1861.

In 1862, Hatton and his men were ordered to the Richmond area to oppose the Federal drive on the Confederate capital. During the resulting Peninsula Campaign, Hatton served with distinction, and on May 23, 1862, he was promoted to brigadier general of the 4th Brigade, 1st Division, Army of Northern Virginia; this appointment was not confirmed by the Confederate Congress. Just eight days later, he was shot in the head and killed while leading his Tennessee Brigade at the Battle of Fair Oaks.

His body was returned to Tennessee for burial, but because Middle Tennessee was occupied by Federal troops, he was temporarily buried at Knoxville. On March 23, 1866, he was reburied in Lebanon's Cedar Grove Cemetery. A statue of him was erected in Lebanon's town square in 1912.

Honors
The Robert H. Hatton Camp #723  of the Sons of Confederate Veterans is named in his memory and honor.

See also

List of American Civil War generals (Confederate)

References

Further reading
 Cummings, Charles M., "Robert Hopkins Hatton: Reluctant Rebel." Tennessee Historical Quarterly Number 23, June 1964, pages 169-81.
 Eicher, John H., and David J. Eicher, Civil War High Commands. Stanford: Stanford University Press, 2001. .
 Sifakis, Stewart. Who Was Who in the Civil War. New York: Facts On File, 1988. .
 Warner, Ezra J. Generals in Gray: Lives of the Confederate Commanders. Baton Rouge: Louisiana State University Press, 1959. .

External links
 Retrieved on 2009-05-03

{{|url=https://www.loc.gov/item/2002711381/ |title=Robert Hopkins Hatton, 1827-1862}}

1826 births
1862 deaths
Politicians from Steubenville, Ohio
Tennessee Whigs
Opposition Party members of the United States House of Representatives from Tennessee
Members of the Tennessee House of Representatives
Tennessee lawyers
American slave owners
Cumberland University alumni
Northern-born Confederates
Confederate States Army generals
People of Tennessee in the American Civil War
Confederate States of America military personnel killed in the American Civil War
United States politicians killed during the Civil War